Frag or Fragging may refer to:

Military
 Fragging, deliberate killing of an unpopular member of one's own fighting unit, occasionally using a fragmentation grenade
 Fragmentation grenade, or 'frag', in military, a type of hand grenade
 Any similar weapons based on the fragmentation effect
 Air Tasking Order, historically 'fragmentary order', now informally 'frag'.  'As fragged', meaning as planned, is a derivative

Arts, entertainment, and media
 Frag, a DC Comics character, and member of The Blasters
 Frag (game), a board game published by Steve Jackson Games, inspired by fragging in video games
 Frag (video gaming), in deathmatch computer games, means to kill someone temporarily, originated from the military term

Science and technology
 Fragmentation (computing), or "fragging", a phenomenon during which storage space is used inefficiently in computer storage
 Fragmentation (reproduction), or "fragging", a form of asexual propagation in aquariums with coral

fr:Frag